Isabelle Yacoubou (born 21 April 1986) is a Beninese-born French basketball player. She plays for France women's national basketball team. She has competed in the 2012 Summer Olympics where France won a silver medal. Since May 2004 she also holds the Beninese record in the shot put at 15.15 meters.

References

External links 

 

1986 births
Living people
Atlanta Dream draft picks
Basketball players at the 2012 Summer Olympics
Basketball players at the 2016 Summer Olympics
Beninese emigrants to France
Beninese expatriate sportspeople in Spain
Beninese expatriate sportspeople in Turkey
Beninese women's basketball players
Black French sportspeople
Centers (basketball)
Fenerbahçe women's basketball players
French women's basketball players
Heilongjiang Dragons players
Knights of the Ordre national du Mérite
Medalists at the 2012 Summer Olympics
Olympic basketball players of France
Olympic medalists in basketball
Olympic silver medalists for France
People from Atlantique Department
Tarbes Gespe Bigorre players
French expatriate basketball people in Spain
French expatriate basketball people in Turkey
France women's national basketball team players